Ophiclinus brevipinnis, the Shortfin snakeblenny, is a species of clinid found in the coastal waters of southern Australia where it inhabits the spaces under rocky ledges and can also be found in weed patches at a depth of around . It can reach a maximum length of  TL.

References

brevipinnis
Fish described in 1980
Taxa named by Victor G. Springer